Gladys Verhulst (born 2 January 1997) is a French professional racing cyclist, who rides for UCI Women's Continental Team  in 2022 after two years with .

Major results

2015
 2nd Road race, National Junior Road Championships
 10th Chrono des Nations Juniors
2018
 National Road Championships
1st  Under-23 road race
2nd Road race
 5th Grand Prix International d'Isbergues
2020
 National Road Championships
2nd Road race
2021
 1st Grand Prix Féminin de Chambéry
 2nd GP de Plouay
 4th Le Samyn
 National Road Championships
3rd Road race
2022
 National Road Championships
2nd Road race
  Stage 1 Tour de France

References

External links
 

1997 births
Living people
French female cyclists
Sportspeople from Seine-Maritime
European Games competitors for France
Cyclists at the 2019 European Games
Cyclists from Normandy